Elections to the Zollparlament of the German Zollverein were held in February and March 1868. The Zollparlament consisted of the members of the Reichstag of the North German Confederation and members from the South German states. Those South German members were elected in these elections, the North Germans were the Reichstag members elected the previous year.

In total, 85 South Germans were elected: 48 from Bavaria, 14 from Baden, six from Hesse-Darmstadt (additionally to the three Reichstag members in the province of Upper Hesse), and 17 from Württemberg. Most of the South German Zollparlament members were anti-Prussian regionalists. The outcome of the elections did not encourage Bismarck to take advantage of the Zollparlament as a vehicle for the politician unification of Germany.

Results

Baden

Bavaria

Hessen

Württemberg

References

1868
1868 elections in Europe
1868 elections in Germany
February 1868 events
March 1868 events